In Adam's Dress and a Bit in Eve's Too was a 1971 Finnish comedy film directed and written by Matti Kassila (based on the novel by Yrjö Soini), and starring Heikki Kinnunen and Juha Hyppönen. Its running time is 88 minutes.

Cast
Heikki Kinnunen as Heikki Himanen
Juha Hyppönen as Jussi Kirves
Marja-Leena Kouki as Marja
Tuire Salenius as Tuire Korpela
Kauko Helovirta as Police Chief Korpela
Risto Mäkelä as Yrjö Granberg
Pia Hattara as Selma
Tiina Rinne as Salme
Pentti Irjala as Hiski
Tapio Hämäläinen as Constable Niemelä
Eila Rinne as Kerttu Luodepohja
Raili Veivo as Niemelä's Wife
Ada Pääkkönen-Koponen as Farm Matron (as Ada Pääkkönen)
Salme Karppinen as Tyyne
Veijo Pasanen as Veijo Viirimäki

See also
Aatamin puvussa ja vähän Eevankin (1931)
Aatamin puvussa ja vähän Eevankin (1940)
Two Times Adam, One Time Eve (1959)

External links
 

1970s Finnish-language films
1971 films
Films directed by Matti Kassila
1971 comedy films
Films based on Finnish novels
Finnish comedy films
Remakes of Finnish films